Tran Thi Ngoc Truc (born February 11, 1989, in Ho Chi Minh City) is a Vietnamese taekwondo practitioner. She won a gold medal for the women's flyweight division at the 2006 World Youth Taekwondo Championships, coincidentally in her home city.

Tran represented Vietnam at the 2008 Summer Olympics in Beijing, where she competed for the women's 49 kg class. She defeated Papua New Guinea's Theresa Tona in the preliminary round of sixteen, before losing out the quarterfinal match to Thailand's Buttree Puedpong, with a sudden death score of 1–2. Because her opponent advanced further into the final match, Tran offered another shot for the bronze medal through the repechage bout, where she was defeated by Cuba's Daynellis Montejo, with a score of 0–4.

References

External links
 

NBC 2008 Olympics profile

Vietnamese female taekwondo practitioners
1989 births
Living people
Olympic taekwondo practitioners of Vietnam
Taekwondo practitioners at the 2008 Summer Olympics
Sportspeople from Ho Chi Minh City
21st-century Vietnamese women